Cacia hebridarum is a species of beetle in the family Cerambycidae. It was described by Stephan von Breuning in 1970. It is known from Vanuatu.

References

Cacia (beetle)
Beetles described in 1970